The Metropolitan Transit Authority of Harris County, Texas provides a bus service that almost solely operates within the city of Houston and its Harris County, Texas suburbs. Some commuter routes travel to adjacent Fort Bend County, Texas and many commuter routes connect with park and ride lots.

Bus routes

Local bus routes – 
Limited bus routes – 
Park and Ride routes – 
Shuttle and Circulatory routes – 
Quickline routes – 
METRORail routes –

Former routes
 1 Hospital (eliminated due to new bus route system in summer 2015)
 5 Kashmere (renamed 5 Kashmere/Southmore and Kashmere section eliminated due to new bus route system in summer 2015)
 7
 7 Tanglewood
 9 Hirsch / Med Center
 11 Nance (became 11 Almeda/Nance and Nance section eliminated due to new bus route system in summer 2015)
 12 Allen House
 13 Plaza del Oro Circulator
 15 Fulton (Original name was 15 Fulton, became 15 Fulton/Hiram Clarke and was changed back)
 16 Memorial
 17 Gulfton (originally 17 Tanglewood and became 17 Gulfton/Tanglewood)
 18 Kirby (eliminated due to new bus route system in summer 2015)
 19 Wilcrest (eliminated due to new bus route system in summer 2015)
 21 Northshore Limited
 22 Almeda
 24 Kempwood
 24 Northline (eliminated due to new bus route system in summer 2015)
 28 Southmore
 31 Memorial Limited
 32 Harwin Limited
 33 Post Oak (replaced by 433 Silver Line and 20 Canal/Memorial in 2020)
 34 Montrose (eliminated due to new bus route system in summer 2015)
 35 Fairview (originally 35 Leeland, later 35 Fairview/Leeland)
 37 El Sol (eliminated due to new bus route system in summer 2015)
 38
 39 Long Point
 39 Parker Circulator
 41 Garden Villas Express
 41 Gulf Meadows Circulator
 42 Holman (eliminated due to new bus route system in summer 2015)
 43 South Belt Limited
 43 Pinemont Plaza
 51
 53 Briar Forest (eliminated due to new bus route system in summer 2015; originally named 53 Westheimer Limited)
 54 Aldine / Hollyvale Circulator
 55
 55 Greenspoint/Kingwood Limited (ran from May 30, 2004 to October 30, 2004)
 57 JFK Limited
 59 Southwest Freeway P&R
 61
 62
 63 San Felipe Limited (Fondren Road section replaced by Route 163 in the early 1990s; rest discontinued in 1997; 163 was renumbered 63 in Summer 2015) 
 64 Gulfton Limited
 66 Irvington
 69
 70 University (renamed 70 Memorial/University; now 70 Memorial)
 71
 74 Carver Road Circulator
 75 Taft
 76
 79 W. Little York (split into 3 Langley - Little York and 79 Irvington in 2019)
 81 Westheimer-Sharpstown (eliminated due to new bus route system in summer 2015)
 84 Fountain View (became a branch of 82)
 84 T.C. Jester Limited
 87 Yellowstone Circulator (now named 87 Sunnyside)
 88 Broadway Limited
 89 Yale (merged with Route 65, resplit as 66 Yale)
 89 South Park Circulator
 90
 91 North Shepherd / Texas Medical Center
 92 Westwood / Texas Medical Center
 93 Greens Road (renumbered 102 when the shuttle expansions occurred in the 1990s)
 93 Northwest / Greenway Shuttle
 94
 95 Uptown Post Oak
 96 Uptown St. James
 98 Texas Special Blue
 99 Texas Special Red
 101 Airport Express
 107 FM 1960
 112 FM 149
 112 Bush IAH Downtown Direct
 119 Wilcrest Commuter (renumbered from 19 in 1990s, renumbered back to 19 in 1997)
 131 Memorial Limited (eliminated due to new bus route system in summer 2015)
 132 Harwin Limited (eliminated due to new bus route system in summer 2015)
 143 South Belt Express
 163 Fondren Limited (eliminated due to new bus route system in summer 2015; replaced by new 63 Fondren)
 164 Hillcroft
 201 North Shepherd
 202 Kuykendahl (amalgamated into 209, returned to its original number in 2021) 
 203 Seton Lake
 204 Spring (amalgamated into 209, returned to its original number in 2021) 
 205 Kingwood
 206 Eastex
 209 Kuykendahl / Spring (split back into 202 and 204 in 2021)
 210 Katy / West Belt
 212 Seton Lake P&R (absorbed into 44 in 2019)
 214 Northwest Station (amalgamated into 219, returned to its original number in 2021 and merged with 216; later absorbed into 216) 
 215 West Little York Commuter
 216 West Little York/Pinemont (amalgamated into 219, returned to its original number in 2021) 
 217 Cypress (amalgamated into 219 in 2020, returned to its original number in 2021) 
 219 West Litle York/Northwest Station/Cypress (split into 214/216 and 217 in 2021)
 221 Kingsland (amalgamated into 229; returned to its original number in 2021 and merged with 228; later absorbed into 228) 
 222 Grand Parkway (amalgamated into 229 in 2020, returned to its original number in 2021) 
 227 Katy Freeway P&R
 228 Addicks (amalgamated into 229, returned to its original number in 2021) 
 229 Addicks/Kingsland/Grand Parkway (split into 221/228 and 222 in 2021)
 244 Monroe/Pasadena (amalgamated into 249; returned to its original number in 2021 and merged with 248) 
 245 Edgebrook P&R
 246 Bay Area (amalgamated into 249; returned to its original number in 2021 and merged with 247; later absorbed into 247) 
 247 Fuqua (amalgamated into 249; returned to its original number) 
 248 El Dorado (amalgamated into 249, returned to its original number in 2021 and merged with 244; later absorbed into 244) 
 249 (split back into 244/248 and 246/247)
 255 Kingwood (amalgamated into 259, returned to its original number in 2023 and merged with 256; later absorbed into 256) 
 256 Eastex (amalgamated into 259; returned to its original number in 2023 and merged with 255) 
 257 Townsen (amalgamated into 259; returned to its original number in 2023)
 259 Kingwood (split into 255/256 and 257 in 2023)
 261 West Loop P&R 
 262 Westwood (amalgamated into 269) 
 263 Alief P&R (amalgamated into 269) 
 265 West Bellfort (amalgamated into 269 in 2020) 
 273 Gessner P&R
 274 Westchase/Gessner P&R (originally 274 Westchase P&R; eliminated due to new bus route system in summer 2015)
 283 Kuykendahl
 284 Kingwood/Uptown P&R
 285 Kingsland/Uptown P&R
 286 Little York/Pinemont/Uptown P&R
 289 San Jacinto P&R
 291 North Shepherd/TMC
 295 Uptown Post Oak Addicks/Galleria Commuter
 312 Grocers Shuttle (amalgamated into 5 in 2020)
 313 Allen Parkway Special
 320 TMC Red Shuttle
 321 TMC White Shuttle
 322 TMC Blue Shuttle
 323 TMC North Circulator
 324 TMC South Circulator
 325 Smith Lands Circulator
 326 TMC Campus Trolley
 352 Swingle Shuttle
 364 MCTX Flex Route
 402 P & HC Shuttle
 402 Bellaire Flyer
 403 S & K Shuttle
 404 Northwest Shuttle
 404 Beechnut Flyer
 412 Greenlink Circulator Green Route
 413 Greenlink Circulator Orange Route
 418 Harris County Jury Shuttle (cancelled due to low ridership)
 420 Post Oak Special Gold
 421 Post Oak Special Green
 426 TWC Swiftline
 427 TWC Swiftline
 464 Bell Station Trolley
 465 Main Street Square Trolley
 466 St. Joseph/Preston Trolley
 500 Airport Direct

References

External links
Metro Bus & Rail Schedules

Metropolitan Transit Authority of Harris County
METRORail
Houston